Dato' Dr. Hou Kok Chung (born 22 February 1963) is a Malaysian politician from the Malaysian Chinese Association (MCA) of the opposition Barisan National (BN) coalition.

Personal life and education 
Hailing from the state of Johor, his birthplace is Kluang, he received his early education at Kahang Chinese Primary School, Tengku Aris Bendahara Kluang National Secondary School, Sultan Abdul Jalil Kluang National Secondary School, Chong Hwa Chinese Secondary School and Kluang High School.

Kok Chung is married to Lim Mooi Lang, and together has a son and two daughters.

Kok Chung is an alumnus of University of Malaya (UM), and a Doctor of Philosophy (PhD) from the SOAS, University of London. He started as a lecturer in UM, moving up in his academic career as an associate professor, as Head of the East Asia Studies and most recently helm the Institute for China Studies in the same university as its director, when he opted for early retirement to contest in the 12th Malaysian general election.

He had written, as well as co-authored numerous books, mostly related to the political, economic, education dan cultural endeavours of the Chinese community in Malaysia, and its connections to East Asian countries namely China, Japan dan Taiwan.

Kok Chung’s academic passion saw him appointed into Universiti Tunku Abdul Rahman (UTAR) Council as the deputy chairman; council member of Tunku Abdul Rahman University College (TAR UC); Guest Professor to Xiamen University; and an adjunct professor of UTAR.

Political career 
Formerly one of the four vice-presidents of MCA (2013-2018), he secured the second highest number of votes during the party election held on 21 December 2013. Kok Chung is a 2nd term Senator in the Senate of Malaysia appointed in 2014 and ends in 2020.

In the 12th Malaysian general election, Kok Chung contested in the parliamentary constituency of Kluang (P.152) in the state of Johor as the Barisan Nasional (BN) candidate, which he won. Winning in the 12th GE, Kok Chung’s earned a place as the deputy minister for Higher Education in the then newly-formed Malaysian Cabinet.

In the 13th Malaysian general election in 2013, Kok Chung re-contested the constituency of Kluang, but was defeated by a Democratic Action Party (DAP) opponent, Liew Chin Tong. In the 14th Malaysian general election, Kok Chung contested the Tebrau constituency (P.158) in Johor, but ultimately lost to Pakatan Harapan's Choong Shiau Yoon.

Election results

Honours 
  :
  Knight Companion of the Order of the Crown of Pahang (DIMP) - Dato' (2010)

References

External links 
Top Management Profile of Malaysian Ministry of Higher Education

Malaysian politicians of Chinese descent
Living people
1963 births
People from Johor
Members of the Dewan Rakyat
Members of the Dewan Negara
Malaysian Chinese Association politicians
University of Malaya alumni
Academic staff of the University of Malaya
21st-century Malaysian politicians